Siegfried Stohr (born 10 October 1952) is a former racing driver from Italy.  He participated in 13 Formula One World Championship Grands Prix, debuting on 15 March 1981.  He scored no championship points.

Biography
Stohr started in the Italian Formula Italia class in 1976 finishing second in the championship. In 1977 he won the series. Stohr won the Italian Formula Three Championship in 1978 driving a Chevron and progressed to Formula two for 1979 where he took second places at Vallelunga and Pau, with a Chevron before switching with less success to a March. For 1980 he joined Alan Docking Racing, driving a Toleman, and finished fourth in the championship with one win, at Enna.

Stohr joined Arrows for the 1981 Formula One season, as teammate to Riccardo Patrese. Patrese proved considerably faster than Stohr, who struggled in his first few races. Just as Stohr began to improve, he was involved in a start-line accident at the 1981 Belgian Grand Prix; after Patrese's engine stalled, his mechanic Dave Luckett ran onto the grid to try to reignite it while the race had already started. Stohr crashed into the back of Patrese's car, seriously injuring Luckett. Stohr's confidence was badly affected by the accident and his performance throughout the rest of the season deteriorated, along with that of his team, relative to their rivals. Stohr retired before the end of the season after crashing out of qualifying for the Italian Grand Prix.

After Formula One, Stohr made a short lived comeback in the Italian Superturismo Championship in 1989 driving a BMW M3.

A psychology graduate at the University of Padua, Stohr started a racing school and safe driving academy at the Misano circuit in 1982. In the 1990s he became a regular columnist for the Italian motorsport weekly Autosprint. He also wrote columns about driving safety in several publications.

Career results

Complete European Formula Two Championship results
(key) (Races in bold indicate pole position; races in italics indicate fastest lap)

Complete Formula One World Championship results
(key)

Complete Formula One non-championship results
(key)

References

 "The Grand Prix Who's Who", Steve Small, 1995.
 Biography at F1 Rejects
 Driver Database profile

Italian racing drivers
Italian Formula One drivers
Formula One journalists and reporters
European Formula Two Championship drivers
Italian Formula Three Championship drivers
Italian people of German descent
Arrows Formula One drivers
1952 births
Living people
Germanophone Italian people
People from Rimini
Alan Docking Racing drivers